Microgastrura is a genus of springtails in the family Hypogastruridae. There are about seven described species in Microgastrura.

Species
These seven species belong to the genus Microgastrura:
 Microgastrura duodecimoculata Stach, 1922 i c g
 Microgastrura jamaicensis (Massoud & Bellinger, 1963) i c g
 Microgastrura massoudi Deharveng & Najt in Tillier, 1988 i c g
 Microgastrura minutissima (Mills, 1934) i c g
 Microgastrura nanacatlica Vàzquez & Palacios-Vargas, 1997 i c g
 Microgastrura sensiliata Jordana, 1981 i c g
 Microgastrura sofiae Vàzquez & Palacios-Vargas, 1997 i c g
Data sources: i = ITIS, c = Catalogue of Life, g = GBIF, b = Bugguide.net

References

Further reading

 
 
 

Collembola
Springtail genera